The 1992 New Orleans Night season was the 2nd season for the franchise. They went 4–6 in 1991 and looked to make the playoffs in 1992, but they went 0–10 and missed the playoffs. Their 0–10 season was the 3rd winless season in Arena Football League history; the last team to do it before the Night was the 1991 Columbus Thunderbolts. They were disbanded after the season.

Regular season

Schedule

Standings

Roster

Awards

Coaching
Vince Gibson entered as the first head coach of the Night. He was also the final coach as it turned out.

External links
1992 New Orleans Night at ArenaFan.com

New Orleans Night
New Orleans Night seasons
New Orleans Night